In English law, a beau pleader is a writ, whereby it is provided that no fine shall be taken of anyone in any court for fair pleading, i.e. for not pleading aptly, and to the purpose.

See also
Statute of Marlborough

References
 

English law
Writs